This is a list of fossiliferous stratigraphic units in Yukon, Canada.

References

 

Yukon
Geology of Yukon